"The Fabulous Irishman" was an American television play broadcast live on June 27, 1957, as part of the CBS television series, Playhouse 90. It was the 39th episode of the first season.

Plot
The play tells the story of Irish politician Robert Briscoe. It begins in 1918 when Briscoe, as a young Jewish Irishman, became active in the Irish Republican Army (IRA). During the Irish War of Independence, he smuggled arms past the Black and Tans and was the subject of a "shoot on sight" order. He later became the first Jewish Lord Mayor of Dublin.

Cast
The cast included performances by:

 Art Carney as Robert Briscoe
 Katharine Bard as Lillian Isaacs
 Michael Higgins as Jamie Farrow
 Charles Davis as Sean O'Brien
 Eli Mintz as Mr. Isaacs
 George Mathews as Mellows
 David Opatoshu as Briscoe's Father
 Berta Gersten
 Peter Lorre

Eddie Cantor hosted the broadcast.

Production
Martin Manulis was the producer and John Frankenheimer the director. Elick Moll wrote the teleplay. The play was presented live on June 27, 1957.

Reception
In The New York Times, J. P. Shanley called it "a splendid tribute to a colorful patriot" and "a most creditable conclusion" to Playhouse 90'''s first season. Shanley wrote that Carney was "ideal" for the title role and that Carney has proven himself "a versatile and brilliant actor."

In The Boston Globe'', Elizabeth W. Driscoll called it "one of the most heartwarming offerings of the season and "a story that had all the authenticity and much of the impact of 'The Informer' without its great tragedy." She praised the absence of "sanctimonious little speeches" and wrote that Carney gave a performance that "helps convince you television is a wonderful thing."

References

1957 American television episodes
Playhouse 90 (season 1) episodes
1957 television plays